was a Japanese-American professor of Geophysics  at the Massachusetts Institute of Technology (MIT), and then at the University of Southern California (USC), seismologist, author and mentor. He and Paul G. Richards coauthored "Quantitative Seismology: theory and methods".

Biography 
Aki was born in Yokohama, Japan. He received his bachelor's degree in 1952 and doctoral degree in 1958, both from the University of Tokyo. Until 1960, he conducted research at that university's Earthquake Research Institute.  He then did post-doctoral research at the Caltech Seismological Laboratory, where he worked with Frank Press.

Press invited Aki to join him at MIT in 1966.  This second visit to the United States coincided with the 1966 Parkfield earthquake, noteworthy for its so-called coda waves, reverberations of seismic energy due to multiple scattering from subsurface inhomogeneities. Aki "developed a passion for using those waves to investigate Earth," according to Bill Ellsworth, Aki's former student who was later head of the USGS seismology group.  "He came from Japan as a statistically oriented seismologist, but he was not afraid to transform himself."

Aki was very active in his field and was the president or chair of many organizations. He was the president of Seismological Section of the AGU, president of the Seismological Society of America, and Chair of the NAS Committee on Seismology. He was instrumental in the creation of the Southern California Earthquake Center, headquartered at the University of Southern California, in 1991, he having moved to USC from MIT in 1984.

In 1995, Aki moved to the seismically active island Réunion, east of Madagascar in the Indian Ocean, where he continued to work until his death there in 2005. He sustained an injury to his brain from a fall while walking in the street on May 13; he fell into a coma and died on May 17. He left behind two sons (Shota and Zenta) and two daughters (Kajika and Uka).

Honors received
Fellow of the American Academy of Arts and Sciences (1973)
Election to the U.S. National Academy of Sciences (1979)
Medal of Seismological Society of America (1986)
Thorarinsson Medal from the International Association of Volcanology and Chemistry of the Earth's Interior (2000)
William Bowie Medal of the American Geophysical Union (2004)
Beno Gutenberg Medal of the European Geosciences Union (2005)

Selected publications

References

 AKI, Keiiti International Who's Who. accessed September 3, 2006.

Japanese emigrants to the United States
People from Yokohama
University of Tokyo alumni
California Institute of Technology alumni
University of Southern California faculty
American seismologists
American academics of Japanese descent
1930 births
2005 deaths
Japanese seismologists
Fellows of the American Academy of Arts and Sciences
Fellows of the Seismological Society of America
Southern California Earthquake Center
Members of the United States National Academy of Sciences
Thorarinsson Medalists